Köln Hansaring railway station is situated in the city of Cologne in the German state of North Rhine-Westphalia, about one kilometre northwest of Köln Hauptbahnhof.

A few hundred metres west of the station is the Betriebsbahnhof Köln Hansaring Wendeanlage (Köln Hansaring operations station reversing facility). At the station Rhine-Ruhr S-Bahn line S 11 branches off towards Neuss Hauptbahnhof via Köln-Nippes station and Köln-Chorweiler on the Lower Left Rhine Railway from S-Bahn line S 12, which runs parallel to the Cologne–Aachen high-speed railway to Düren via Köln-Ehrenfeld and Köln-Weiden West station.

The station (which is classified as a Haltepunkt, that is a "halt", which is defined as having no set of points) and the operating station together form the western end of the trunk line of the Cologne S-Bahn (which is operated as part of the Rhine-Ruhr S-Bahn). It is classified by Deutsche Bahn as a category 4 station. The S-Bahn trains stop here on an island platform, which has a length of 145 metres.

A large part of the platform is located on a bridge over a street called Hansaring. There is a covered connection between the Hansaring S-Bahn station and the Hansaring station of the Cologne Stadtbahn in the median strip of the Hansaring.

History

Köln Hansaring station has a long rail history. As early as 1859, the new connection between the West Rhine Railway (Linke Rheinstrecke) and Cologne Central Station crossed the medieval city walls at this point. In 1881 the city walls were demolished and replaced by a wide ring road, which was called the Hansaring (Hansa Ring) in reference to Cologne's past as a Hanseatic city. With the construction of the new main station, the railway tracks were raised by six metres from 1889. There was already at that time a horse tramway on the Hansaring, which was replaced by an electric tramway in 1903.

In the early 1970s, the Hansaring Stadtbahn tunnel was built and an underground station was opened to traffic at a shallow depth on 25 August 1974. New tracks were built for the S-Bahn on the north side of the existing railway line. The S-Bahn station was connected to the Stadtbahn station and the Stadtbahn station was rebuilt with a high platform for two-thirds of its length. The station was inaugurated on 27 May 1990. At Easter 2003, half of the high platform was reduced in height so that it could be used by coupled low-floor vehicles on the Stadtbahn ring route.

Rail services

Köln Hansaring station is served by the following regional services:

Stadtbahn trains

The station is served by the following Stadtbahn services:

1In the peak hour every 5 minutes between Longerich and Ubierring

References

External links

S6 (Rhine-Ruhr S-Bahn)
S11 (Rhine-Ruhr S-Bahn)
S12 (Rhine-Ruhr S-Bahn)
S13 (Rhine-Ruhr S-Bahn)
Railway stations in Cologne
Rhine-Ruhr S-Bahn stations
Innenstadt, Cologne
Railway stations in Germany opened in 1974
Railway stations in Germany opened in 1990
Cologne KVB stations